Reticulon 4 receptor (RTN4R) also known as Nogo-66 Receptor (NgR) or Nogo receptor 1 is a protein which in humans is encoded by the RTN4R gene. This gene encodes the receptor for reticulon 4, oligodendrocytemyelin glycoprotein and myelin-associated glycoprotein. This receptor mediates axonal growth inhibition and may play a role in regulating axonal regeneration and plasticity in the adult central nervous system.

Function 
The Nogo-66 Receptor (NgR) is a high affinity binding receptor for a region of Nogo, a myelin associated protein that inhibits axon outgrowth. NgR was identified by Strittmatter and colleagues using an expression cloning strategy.

NgR is implicated in neuronal plasticity and regeneration.  Its relative importance in mediating myelin inhibition in vitro and in vivo is currently under intense investigation, since this protein might be a good drug target for treatment of various neurological conditions such as spinal cord injury and stroke.

Nogo pathway: rho kinase 
While the entire pathway is not fully understood, the relationship between NgR and neuronal outgrowth has been fleshed out.  NgR is a membrane protein that, when bound to neurite outgrowth inhibitor (Nogo), inhibits cell growth through the activation of rho kinase (ROCK).

NgR activation of p75 
It was known that NgR, Nogo, and another membrane receptor called p75 were involved in inhibiting neurite outgrowth.  Through a variety of experimental procedures Wang et al. were able to identify the biochemical relationship between NgR and p75.  First, it was observed that when p75 was knocked out in mice, outgrowth inhibition was no longer seen.  Completing binding assays and co-immunoprecipitations revealed that p75 and NgR were not bound to each other through the cellular membrane.  Mutating either p75 or NgR, however, resulted in truncated protein that would help reveal the binding interactions.  When the extracellular domains of the receptors were removed no outgrowth inhibition was seen.  This would suggest that the receptors interact extracellularly.  Furthermore, it was reaffirmed that Nogo and myelin-associated gylcoprotein (MAG) bind NgR and not p75.  The receptor p75 lacks a binding domain for either of these proteins.

Activation of rho protein 
The work of Kaplan and Miller< shows that there is an interaction between the p75/NgR receptors and Rho GDP dissociation inhibitor (Rho-GDI).  Kaplan and Miller show that when Nogo is bound to NgR, Rho-GDI is associated with p75.  When Rho-GDI is drawn to p75 it is no longer bound to Rho-GDP.  This allows for GTP to be exchanged for GDP activating the Rho protein.  Rho-GTP, a Rho GTPase, then activates ROCK which phosphorylates other proteins which inhibit neurite outgrowth.  When Nogo is not bound to NgR, p75 is not activated and Rho-GDI remains bound to Rho-GDP.  The Rho protein remains bound with GDP and remains inactive.  ROCK therefore does not become activated and cannot change transcription patterns to inhibit neuronal outgrowth.

Therapeutic Inhibition 
It is reasonable that inhibition of the above mechanism could aid the recovery of those suffering from spinal cord injuries.  One such therapy is currently in clinical trials.  The drug, called Cethrin, is produced by a group called Alseres.  Cethrin is a ROCK inhibitor and therefore acts in the above pathway to prevent the activation of ROCK so neurite outgrowth can occur.  Cethrin is applied as a paste to the site of injury during decompression surgery.

Regulation of Visual Cortex Plasticity
The Nogo-66 receptor (NgR) limits experience-driven visual cortex plasticity. In mutant mice, non-functional NgR resulted in enhancement of visual cortex plasticity after the critical period into adulthood, such that adult plasticity in the mutant mice resembled normal visual plasticity in juvenile mice brains. This function of NgR is of particular interest to the study of visual disorders that may result from imbalanced input during the critical period, such as amblyopia.

See also
Reticulon 4

References

Further reading

Receptors